Natural is an adjective that refers to nature.

Natural or The Natural(s) may also refer to:

Music 
 Natural sign, a musical notation
 Natural (group), an American boy group
 The Naturals, early 60s British beat group

Albums
 Natural (Crystal Kay album), originally titled Crystal Kay, 2003
 Natural (The Mekons album), 2007
 Natural (Orange Range album), 2005
 Natural (Peter Andre album) or the title song (see below), 1996
 Natural (The Special Goodness album), 2012
 Natural (T-Square album), 1990
 The Natural (Haystak album), 2002
 The Natural (Mic Geronimo album) or the title song (see below), 1995
 The Naturals, by Catherine, or the title song, 2007

Songs
 "Natural" (Imagine Dragons song), 2018
 "Natural" (Peter Andre song), 1997
 "Natural" (S Club 7 song), 2000
 "The Natural" (song), by Mic Geronimo, 1995
 "Natural", by D'Masiv from Persiapan, 2012
 "Natural", by Howard Jones from Human's Lib, 1984
 "Natural", by InMe from Overgrown Eden, 2003
 "Natural", by P-Model from Potpourri
 "Natural", by Woody, 2019
 "Natural", by Zayn from Icarus Falls, 2018

Sports and games
 Butch Reed (1954–2021), or "The Natural", American professional wrestler
 The Naturals, an American professional wrestling duo
 Northwest Arkansas Naturals, a Minor League Baseball team
 Natural (gambling), in some games of chance, a specific type of good outcome
 Natural, a style of bidding in contract bridge

Other uses
 Natural (4GL), an Adabas programming language
 Natural (archaeology), a sediment containing no evidence of human activity
 The Natural, a 1952 novel by Bernard Malamud
 The Natural (film), a 1984 adaptation of Malamud's novel
 The Naturals (book series), a 2013–2017 series of young adult novels by Jennifer Lynn Barnes

See also 

 
 
 Footedness, surfing with the left foot forward
 Legitimacy (family law)
 Natur all, a 2004 album by Cactus Jack
 Natural foods
 Natural history, a broad area of the natural sciences concerned with living things
 Natural logarithm, the logarithm to base e = 2.71828…
 Natural number, in mathematics, numbers 0, 1, 2, 3, …
 Natural philosophy
 Natural product
 Natural resource
 Natural theology
 Natural transformation in mathematics
 Naturalism (disambiguation)
 Naturally (disambiguation)
 Nature (disambiguation)
 Unnatural (disambiguation)